{{Infobox Cultivar | name = Grevillea 'Mason's Hybrid'
| image = Grevillea 'Ned Kelly'.jpg
| image_caption = 
| hybrid = Grevillea banksii × Grevillea bipinnatifida
| cultivar = 'Mason's hybrid'
| origin = Kentlyn Nursery, Kentlyn, New South Wales}}'Grevillea 'Mason's Hybrid' is a grevillea cultivar. It has also been distributed under the names 'Kentlyn' and 'Ned Kelly''.

It is a shrub that grows to 1.5 metres in height and 2 metres in width and has divided leaves. The inflorescences are about 12 cm long by 10 cm wide, with apricot-coloured perianths and red styles.

The cultivar, which is a cross between  Grevillea banksii and an upright glaucous form of G. bipinnatifida'', was registered in 1980 by Mr J. B. Mason.

References
Australian Cultivar Registration Authority: Grevillea 'Mason's Hybrid'

Mason's Hybrid
Cultivars of Australian plants
Garden plants of Australia
Proteales of Australia